J22 may refer to:

Vehicles

Aircraft 
 FFVS J 22, Swedish fighter
 Junkers J 22, a German prototype fighter
 Soko J-22 Orao, a Yugoslavian light bomber

Locomotives 
 GNR Class J22, a British steam locomotive class

Ships and boats 
 J/22, a keelboat
 , a Halcyon-class minesweeper of the Royal Navy
 , an Östergötland-class destroyer of the Swedish Navy
 , a Sandhayak-class survey ship of the Indian Navy

Other uses 
 County Route J22 (California)
 Gyroelongated triangular cupola, a Johnson solid (J22)
 Jennings J-22, a pistol